Escudería Telmex is an auto racing team founded by Mexican businessman Carlos Slim in 2002. The program is designed to provide support for both veteran and up-and-coming Latin American drivers.

Drivers

References

Mexican auto racing teams
Auto racing teams established in 2002